The Gustav Freiwald House is a house located in northeast Portland, Oregon, listed on the National Register of Historic Places.

The house was built in 1906 for Gustav Freiwald, a real estate entrepreneur and one-time owner of the Star Brewery in Vancouver, Washington. A late example of Queen Anne architecture, the house is one of the few remaining grand residences in the area of Portland platted as the Holladay Addition. The house is now part of the Irvington neighborhood.

See also
 National Register of Historic Places listings in Northeast Portland, Oregon

References

External links

1906 establishments in Oregon
Houses completed in 1906
Houses on the National Register of Historic Places in Portland, Oregon
Irvington, Portland, Oregon
Queen Anne architecture in Oregon
Portland Historic Landmarks